Nancy Lee Harris is an educator as well as a well-established medical professional. She currently serves as a professor of pathology at Harvard Medical School. She is also a physician at Massachusetts General Hospital and an editor with the New England Journal of Medicine. She was trained at multiple different hospitals; however, the majority of her adult life has been spent working in Boston, Massachusetts. Throughout her life she has held many notable positions including but not limited to: Director of Hematopathology, Director of Surgical Pathology, Director of Anatomic Pathology, Director of Anatomic and Clinical Pathology Residency Program, and Director of Hematopathology Fellowship Program. Harris is an important and distinguished medical provider in the Greater Boston area and focuses her research on blood malignancies and lymphoid neoplasms.

Family 
She is the wife of Jay R. Harris, who is a radiation oncology professor at Harvard Medical School.   One son Dan Harris, is the co-anchor of the weekend edition of Good Morning America and married to Dr. Bianca Harris. Another son, Matthew Carmichael Harris is a venture capitalist and married to filmmaker Jessica Glass.

Education and Training 
Nancy Lee Harris performed her internship in Internal Medicine at Washington University Barnes-Jewish Hospital. She then moved to Boston, MA and completed her residency in Anatomic and Clinical pathology at Beth Israel Deaconess Medical Center. Harris rounded out her education by completing a fellowship in Hematopathology at Massachusetts General Hospital and is currently board certified in Anatomy pathology and Clinical pathology.

Harris joined Massachusetts General Hospital in 1980 and has since held a variety of different positions. She started off as the Director of Hematopathology and remained the director until 2009. In 1985, she also became the Director of Surgical Pathology until 1992 when she transitioned to the Director of Anatomic Pathology. She remained the Director of Anatomic Pathology until 1998. In 1996, although she was already the Director of Hematopathology and the Director of Anatomic Pathology, Harris added a third title: Director of Anatomic and Clinical Pathology Residency Program. Harris was in charge of the residency program until 2001. When arriving in 1980, Harris also took on the job of being the Director of Hematopathology Fellowship Program until 2004. Harris now serves as the editor of case records of Massachusetts General Hospital for the New England Journal of Medicine (NEJM).

Awards and Publications 
Harris mainly focuses her research on blood malignancies like lymphoma; however, she is also interested in lymphoid neoplasms. Along with the World Health Organization and other scientists, Harris helped to develop the Revised European American Classification of Lymphoid Neoplasms around 2001. This was the first time anyone had come to an international consensus on neoplasm taxonomy. The Revised European American Classification of Lymphoid Neoplasms was updated in 2008.

A second edition of the Hematopathology reference book was published by Harris and her fellow international experts in September 2016. The book includes updated diagnostic techniques as well as suggestions for molecular and genetic testing. In the last 5 years on top of helping to author this new reference book, Harris has been published over 21 times on PubMed.

Harris became the editor for NEJM of the case records found in Massachusetts General Hospital beginning in 2002 and has since discussed 38 pathological mysteries in her first 10 years. However, because of rapid technological advancement as well as the development of new diagnostic tools, pathological mysteries are becoming harder and harder to find leaving Harris with a smaller sample size of mysteries to review.

For all of her hard work, outstanding professional career, and contributions to medicine, Harris was awarded the J. E. Wallace Sterling Lifetime Achievement Award in Medicine from Stanford University.

References

Further reading
Massachusetts General Hospital bio of Harris
New York Times, Oct. 10, 2004 article on the marriage of Matthew Harris and Jessica Glass

Living people
Harvard Medical School faculty
Stanford University School of Medicine alumni
Stanford University alumni
American pathologists
Women pathologists
20th-century American women scientists
21st-century American women scientists
Year of birth missing (living people)
American women academics